was a Japanese mathematician who worked in number theory and mathematical logic.

In 1942 he became a professor at the newly founded Nagoya Imperial University, where he stayed for over twenty years. He is responsible for much of the effort in setting up its Department of Mathematics.

He was married to the renowned number theorist Teiji Takagi's daughter Yakeo. The couple had three sons, all of whom became mathematicians, including S.-Y. Kuroda, who was a professor of linguistics at University of California, San Diego.

He published a text on Foundations of Number Theory with Tomio Kubota in 1963.

References

External links
 Sigekatu Kuroda / Written by J J O'Connor and E F Robertson Last Update July 2011 / School of Mathematics and Statistics University of St Andrews, Scotland

20th-century Japanese mathematicians
University of Tokyo alumni
Academic staff of Ochanomizu University
Academic staff of Nagoya University
University of Maryland, College Park faculty
Japanese emigrants to the United States
1905 births
1972 deaths
People from Tokyo